The Canon FD 35mm f/2.0 lens was manufactured by Canon for the FD lens mount. It was sold in a number of variations over the years, and was the fastest Canon lens in the 35mm focal length before the debut of the EF 35mm f1.4.

Breech-Lock Mount (FD) 

 Black Bayonet Mount, Concave Front Element, Min Aperture f/16
 Black Bayonet Mount, Concave Front Element, SSC Coating, Min Aperture f/16
 Chrome Bayonet Mount, Concave Front Element, SSC Coating, Min Aperture f/16
 Chrome Bayonet Mount, Convex Front Element, SSC Coating, Min Aperture f/22

Bayonet Mount (nFD) 
With a 10-element, 8-group construction, the new FD 35mm f/2 was approximately 25 percent shorter and 29 percent lighter than the earlier FD design.
 Black, Convex Front Element, Standard New FD Coating, Min Aperture f/22

Thorium 
Most or all old FD versions of the lens (identified by their silver rather than black bayonet mount, coupled with a concave front glass element) contained the radioactive element Thorium in some of their optical elements. This has created concerns that these lenses may not be safe for regular use (for your own evaluation, see measurements and references in the above source lummukka.com).
On top of health risks any user must evaluate for themselves, the thoriated glass elements develop a yellow tint over time, reducing transmission and interfering with neutral color reproduction. The internet holds tips involving ultraviolet light to at least temporarily remove the tint.
A legend has been prevailing whereby these Thorium (Old FD) lenses were sharper side-to-side and at all apertures than the subsequent New FD version. Believers claim this to be due to the properties of Thorium dioxide glass with its enhanced refractive indices. However, direct comparisons have revealed that advances in optical design and lens coating had eliminated any shortcomings by the time the (non-radioactive) New FD version arrived. Compare  and.

External links 
 http://www.lummukka.com/canonfd35.html
 FD Lenses - Canon Camera Museum
 New FD Lenses - Canon Camera Museum
 http://www.verybiglobo.com/which-35mm-lens-is-the-best-battle-of-35mm-lenses-on-sony-nex-7-part-i-bokeh/

References 

Canon FD lenses